Santiago Eduardo Quintanilla Ureta (born 30 July 1948), known as Eduardo Quintanilla, is a Chilean former footballer who played as a midfielder. Besides Chile, he developed his career in Central America.

Career
A midfielder from Colo-Colo, Quintanilla also played for Deportes Ovalle and Palestino in his homeland, winning the 1972 Segunda División de Chile with the second. 

He emigrated to Central America and played in Nicaragua, Honduras, Panama, El Salvador and Costa Rica. In Honduras, he played for Motagua and CD Olimpia. In El Salvador, he played for Águila before arriving to Costa Rica and joining San Carlos in December 1977, where he played until 1982. 

Considered a historical player of AD San Carlos, where he made up a well remembered pair alongside William Ávila, he won two league titles of the Segunda División in 1977 and 1978.

In the Costa Rican Primera División, he scored nine goals in total, becoming the Chilean top goalscorer in that country. 

He retired from football due to a serious traffic accident at the age of thirty three. After, he coached the AD San Carlos reserve team for a brief stint with Toribio Rojas as head coach.

Personal life
He was nicknamed Chucha, as a profanity widely used in his country of birth to express surprise, among other uses.

He made his home in Costa Rica and has worked for the Maracana sports complex in Quesada, San Carlos.

Honours
Palestino
 Segunda División de Chile: 1972

San Carlos
 Segunda División de Costa Rica (2): 1977, 1978

References

1948 births
Living people
Chilean footballers
Chilean expatriate footballers
Chilean Primera División players
Colo-Colo footballers
Primera B de Chile players
Deportes Ovalle footballers
Club Deportivo Palestino footballers
Liga Nacional de Fútbol Profesional de Honduras players
F.C. Motagua players
C.D. Olimpia players
Salvadoran Primera División players
C.D. Águila footballers
Segunda División de Costa Rica players
Liga FPD players
A.D. San Carlos footballers
Chilean expatriate sportspeople in Nicaragua
Chilean expatriate sportspeople in Honduras
Chilean expatriate sportspeople in Panama
Chilean expatriate sportspeople in El Salvador
Chilean expatriate sportspeople in Costa Rica
Expatriate footballers in Nicaragua
Expatriate footballers in Honduras
Expatriate footballers in Panama
Expatriate footballers in El Salvador
Expatriate footballers in Costa Rica
Association football midfielders
Chilean football managers
Chilean expatriate football managers
Expatriate football managers in Costa Rica
Place of birth missing (living people)